In representation theory, a branch of mathematics, Artin's theorem, introduced by E. Artin, states that a character on a finite group is a rational linear combination of characters induced from all cyclic subgroups of the group.

There is a similar but somehow more precise theorem due to Brauer, which says that the theorem remains true if "rational" and "cyclic subgroup" are replaced with "integer" and "elementary subgroup".

Statement 
In Linear Representation of Finite Groups Serre states in Chapter 9.2, 17  the theorem in the following, more general way:

Let  finite group,  family of subgroups.

Then the following are equivalent:

 
 

Proof

References

Further reading 
 http://www.math.toronto.edu/murnaghan/courses/mat445/artinbrauer.pdf

Representation theory of finite groups